Betty Boniphace (Omara) (born 1993) is a Dar-es-Salaam born beauty queen who won the title of Miss Universe Tanzania 2013 on 27 September 2013. She represented her country at the 2013 Miss Universe competition in Moscow, Russia.

Miss Universe Tanzania 2013
Betty won the crown of Miss Universe Tanzania 2013 at the National Museum Hall in Dar es Salaam on Friday night 27 September 2013, where Clara Noor was given the title of Miss Earth Tanzania and Aziza Victoria was declared as the runner up.

Miss Universe 2013
She represented Tanzania in the 62nd edition of the Miss Universe which took take place on November 9, 2013, at the Crocus City Hall in Moscow, Russia.

References

External links
Official Miss Tanzania website 

Living people
Miss Universe 2013 contestants
Tanzanian female models
Tanzanian beauty pageant winners
People from Dar es Salaam
1993 births